Jiaoxin Station is a station of Guangzhou Metro Line 8, located underground in Jiaoxin Estate, Baiyun District, Guangzhou, Guangdong Province, China.  The station was opened on November 26, 2020 with the opening of the northern extension of Guangzhou Metro Line 8.

History
As with other stations on the northern extension of Line 8, the name of this station was published on December 2, 2016.

Station layout
The station has 2 underground side platforms. Platform 1 is a termination platform, whilst platform 2 is for trains towards Wanshengwei.

Exits
There are 4 exits, lettered A, B, C and D. Exit D is accessible. Exit A is located on Jiaoxin Road, exit B is located on Lianjiao Road and exits C and D are located on Shisha Road.

Gallery

References

Railway stations in China opened in 2020
Guangzhou Metro stations in Baiyun District